Americo L. Santiago (born July 4, 1951) is an American politician.

Santiago lived in Bridgeport, Connecticut. He served in the Connecticut House of Representatives from 1989 to 1995 and was a Democrat. His son Ezequiel Santiago also served in the Connecticut General Assembly.

Notes

1951 births
Hispanic and Latino American state legislators in Connecticut
Living people
Politicians from Bridgeport, Connecticut
Democratic Party members of the Connecticut House of Representatives